Mejía District is one of six districts of the province Islay in Peru.

It is a popular summertime destination for vacationers from Arequipa.

References